Edmund Czaplicki (30 October 1904 – August 1940) was a Polish ice hockey player who competed in the 1928 Winter Olympics.

He was born in Warsaw. During World War II he was imprisoned by the Soviet NKVD in Starobielsk, and later executed in Kharkiv.

In 1928 he participated with the Polish ice hockey team in the Olympic tournament.

References

External links
 profile 

1904 births
1940 deaths
AZS Warszawa (ice hockey) players
Ice hockey players at the 1928 Winter Olympics
Olympic ice hockey players of Poland
People from Warsaw Governorate
Polish people executed by the Soviet Union
Sportspeople from Warsaw
Polish civilians killed in World War II